Kapa or KAPA may refer to:
 Kapa, a fabric that was made by Native Hawaiians
 KAPA, a radio station in Hilo, Hawaii, United States
 Kapa, Burkina Faso, a village in the Fara Department of Balé Province in southern Burkina Faso
 Centennial Airport, public use airport in Arapahoe County, Colorado, United States
 Käpylän Pallo, a football (soccer) club from the Käpylä district of Helsinki
the Crnogorska kapa, worn in Montenegro
 Kapa haka, a traditional Maori arts festival, centred around the performance of haka and related dance

People 
 Eparaima Te Mutu Kapa (1842–1925), Māori member of the New Zealand parliament
 Mutu Kapa (1870–1968), New Zealand tribal leader, sportsman, Anglican priest

Other 
 Kapa investment scam, an alleged scam that occurred in the Philippines in June 2019

See also 

Kaja (name)
 Kappa (disambiguation)